This list of University of Nebraska–Lincoln people includes notable graduates, instructors, and administrators affiliated with University of Nebraska–Lincoln.  Three Nobel Prize winners have been associated with the university.

Nobel laureates

Pulitzer Prize winners

Academics

College founders, presidents, and deans

Professors and scholars

Arts, design and entertainment

Business

Law and politics

Heads of state

United States cabinet secretaries and leaders

Governors

United States Senators

United States Representatives

Federal judges

Nebraska representatives

Nebraska judges

Other political figures

Military

Literature

Science and technology

Athletics

Baseball

Basketball

 Terran Petteway (born 1992), basketball player in the Israeli Basketball Premier League

Football

Other sports

Faculty

References

Lists of people by university or college in Nebraska
Nebraska-Lincoln, University of